British re-armament was a period in British history, between 1934 and 1939, when a substantial programme of re-arming the United Kingdom was undertaken. Re-armament was necessary, because defence spending had gone down from £766 million in 1919–20, to £189 million in 1921–22, to £102 million in 1932.

Ten Year Rule
After World War I, dubbed "The War To End All Wars” and “The Great War”, Britain (along with many other nations) had wound down its military capability. The Ten Year Rule said that a "great war" was not expected in the next ten years with the belief in its impossibility and the folly of preparing for it. Britain, therefore, made almost no investment at all in the development of new armament. The British Admiralty, however, requested the suspension of this rule when Japan invaded Manchuria in 1931. The policy was officially abandoned on 23 March 1932 by the Cabinet, four months before Adolf Hitler's Nazis became the largest party in the German Reichstag. A statement released cautioned that the decision was not an endorsement of increased armament spending, citing the grave economic situation in Britain and also indicating the British commitment to the arms limitations being promoted by the World Disarmament Conference, an event coinciding with the announcement.

There are sources who describe the British re-armament immediately after the abrogation of the Ten Year Rule as uncertain, hovering between disarmament and re-armament. Even after the collapse of the League of Nations in 1935, the re-armament policy has been tempered by appeasement.

Collapse of international disarmament
Germany was not considered a threat during the 1920s, but the situation changed radically when Hitler came to power in 1933 and withdrew Germany from the League of Nations and the Geneva Disarmament conference.

In October 1933, when the failure of the Disarmament Conference was evident, a Defence Requirements Sub-Committee of the Committee of Imperial Defence was appointed to examine the worst deficiencies of the armed forces. The group first considered the Far East, but soon looked at dangers nearer home.

Re-armament
Government-backed "Shadow Factories", generally privately owned but subsidised by the government, were established to increase the capacity of private industry; some were also built by the government. Similarly, Agency Factories supplemented the Royal Ordnance Factories.

Royal Air Force
In the mid-1930s, the Royal Air Force's front-line fighters were biplanes, little different from those employed in World War I. The re-armament programme enabled the RAF to acquire modern monoplanes, like the Hawker Hurricane and Supermarine Spitfire, such that  sufficient numbers were available to defend the UK in the Battle of Britain in 1940, during the early stages of World War II.

Royal Navy
Re-armament also led to the Royal Navy acquiring five new battleships of the King George V class, and modernising existing battleships to varying extents.

Equally importantly, aircraft carriers of the Illustrious class and a series of large cruiser classes were ordered and expedited. Britain also accelerated building programmes such as the Singapore Naval Base, which was completed within three and a half years instead of five.

British Army
The British Army was supplied with modern tanks and weapons, for example howitzers, and the Royal Ordnance Factories were equipped to produce munitions on a large scale.

See also
 German re-armament
 Ten Year Rule

References

Further reading

External links
UK War Production

1930s in the United Kingdom
Government munitions production in the United Kingdom
Technological races